Lanark is a ghost town in Doña Ana County, New Mexico about 30 miles northwest of El Paso, Texas and close to Kilbourne Hole.

History
Lanark had a U.S. Post Office from 1905 until 1923.
Extant is a "small collection of buildings, water tank, and fuel depot built for trains on the Southern Pacific Railroad track from El Paso, Texas to Los Angeles."

References 

Ghost towns in New Mexico
History of Doña Ana County, New Mexico
Geography of Doña Ana County, New Mexico